Tamorrion Terry (born March 21, 1998) is an American football wide receiver who is a free agent. He played college football at Florida State.

Early years
Terry attended Turner County High School in Ashburn, Georgia. He committed to Florida State University to play college football.

College career
After redshirting his first year at Florida State in 2017, Terry played in 12 games and made 11 starts in 2018. He finished the year with 35 receptions for 744 yards and eight touchdowns. The 744 receiving yards broke the schools freshman record. As a redshirt sophomore in 2019, Terry started all 13 games and led the team with 60 receptions for 1,188 yards and nine touchdowns. Rather than enter the 2020 NFL Draft, he returned to Florida State.

Professional career

Terry signed with the Seattle Seahawks as an undrafted free agent on May 14, 2021. He was waived on June 30.

Legal issues
Terry was one of 11 people indicted on felony murder charges by a grand jury in Georgia in June 2021, stemming from a gang-related mass shooting outside a nightclub in Ashburn, Georgia, in which seven people were shot and one woman was killed.

References

External links
Florida State Seminoles bio

1998 births
Living people
People from Turner County, Georgia
Players of American football from Georgia (U.S. state)
American football wide receivers
Florida State Seminoles football players
Seattle Seahawks players